The Jeddah Superdome (JSD) is a 35,000 seat multi-purpose event space located on Madinah Road, west of King Abdullah Sports City, Jeddah, Saudi Arabia. Since its opening in mid-2021, it hosts all local and international exhibitions, conferences, and events in the city.

Events
 Elimination Chamber (2022)
Oleksandr Usyk vs Anthony Joshua II
King and Queen of the Ring 2023

See also
List of largest buildings

References

Buildings and structures in Jeddah
Sports venues in Saudi Arabia
Multi-purpose stadiums in Saudi Arabia
Geodesic domes

Boxing venues
Wrestling venues